Dino Meneghin (born 18 January 1950) is an Italian former professional basketball player. He is widely considered to be the best Italian player ever, as well as one of Europe's all-time greats. A 2.06 m (6 ft 9 in) tall center, Meneghin was born in Alano di Piave, Veneto (northeast Italy). On 20 November 1966, when he was 16 years old, he played in his first game in the Italian League, with Ignis Varese. He played the last game of his career at the age of 45. 

He holds the record for the most EuroLeague championships won by a player, with seven, when counting all formats of the competition's history, dating back to the inaugural 1958 season. In 2003, Meneghin became a Basketball Hall of Fame player. In 2006, he became a member of the Italian Basketball Hall of Fame. In 2010, he became a FIBA Hall of Fame player.

Professional career
In total, Meneghin played in 836 games and scored 8,560 points in the Italian League championship.  Meneghin became the second player from a European league to be drafted by an NBA team, when the Atlanta Hawks manager Marty Blake selected him with a late-round pick in the 1970 NBA draft. He never played in the USA, however.

In 1980 and 1983, he was elected European Player of the Year: Mr. Europa, and he also won the Euroscar European Player of the Year award in 1983. In 1991, he was named the greatest FIBA European Champions' Cup (EuroLeague) basketball player of all time, by the Italian basketball magazine Giganti del Basket. 

One of the greatest records of his career is his number of Finals appearances in the FIBA European Champions Cup (EuroLeague). He played in 10 consecutive finals with Pallacanestro Varese, winning 5; and later in 2 more consecutive finals with Olimpia Milano, winning both. Finally, before his playing career ended, Meneghin played in the Italian League against his son, Andrea, who was also a great international player.

On 28 October 2019, 25 years after he last played professionally, Olimpia Milano retired the number 11 in honor of Meneghin. The number 11 matched the number of seasons that he had played with the Italian club.

National team career
With the senior Italian national basketball team, Meneghin played in 271 games, and totaled 2,847 points scored. With Italy, he won the bronze medal at both the 1971 EuroBasket and the 1975 EuroBasket. He also won the silver medal at the 1980 Summer Olympics, and the gold medal at the 1983 EuroBasket.

Post-playing career
On 5 September 2003 Meneghin became the second Italian player to enter into the Basketball Hall of Fame, after Cesare Rubini, who served Olimpia Milano, both as player and coach between the 1940s and the 1970s. After his playing career ended, Meneghin has since worked for the Italian Basketball Federation and for Olimpia Milano.

Personal life
Dino Meneghin is the father of Andrea Meneghin, who also played professional basketball. Andrea played against his father, during the latter's last season as a pro.

Honours and awards

Clubs
4× FIBA World Cup for Clubs champion: (1967, 1970, 1973, 1987)
7× FIBA European Champions Cup (EuroLeague) champion: (1970, 1972, 1973, 1975, 1976, 1987, 1988)
2× FIBA European Cup Winners Cup (Saporta Cup) champion: (1967, 1980)
FIBA Korać Cup champion: (1985)
12× Italian League champion: (1969–1971, 1973, 1974, 1977, 1978, 1982, 1985, 1986, 1987, 1989)
6× Italian Cup winner: (1969, 1970, 1971, 1973, 1986, 1987)

Italian senior national team
EuroBasket 1971: 
EuroBasket 1975: 
1980 Summer Olympic Games: 
EuroBasket 1983:

Individual
EuroLeague Finals Top Scorer: (1974)
FIBA European Selection: (1975)
2× Mister Europa European Player of the Year: 1980, 1983
Euroscar European Player of the Year: 1983
FIBA's 50 Greatest Players: 1991
Italian Basketball Hall of Fame: 2006
50 Greatest EuroLeague Contributors: 2008
FIBA Hall of Fame: 2010
 Number 11 jersey retired by retired by Olimpia Milano: 2019

References

External links
 
 
 Italian League Profile 
 Euroleague.net 50 Greatest Contributors
 Fibaeurope.com Profile
 Dino Meneghin Player Profile (InterBasket)

1950 births
Living people
Atlanta Hawks draft picks
Basketball players at the 1972 Summer Olympics
Basketball players at the 1976 Summer Olympics
Basketball players at the 1980 Summer Olympics
Basketball players at the 1984 Summer Olympics
Centers (basketball)
Euroscar award winners
FIBA EuroBasket-winning players
FIBA Hall of Fame inductees
Italian men's basketball players
1970 FIBA World Championship players
1978 FIBA World Championship players
Medalists at the 1980 Summer Olympics
Naismith Memorial Basketball Hall of Fame inductees
Olimpia Milano players
Olympic basketball players of Italy
Olympic medalists in basketball
Olympic silver medalists for Italy
Pallacanestro Trieste players
Pallacanestro Varese players
Sportspeople from the Province of Belluno